The Douglas Residential Historic District is an area located in Douglas, Arizona, consisting of almost 500 buildings, of which 325 are contributing structures to the District.  Architectural styles include Late 19th and 20th Century Revival; Bungalow, Craftsman, Victorian, and Queen Anne.

References

National Register of Historic Places in Cochise County, Arizona
Historic districts in Arizona